A double-double refers to a basketball achievement where a player accumulates double digits in two of a certain five statistical categories in a single game.

It may also refer to:

 Double-double, a type of Double (volleyball)
 Double-Double, a cheeseburger with two patties and two slices of cheese from In-N-Out Burger
 Double-double arithmetic, a software technique for attaining quadruple precision in numerical analysis; see Quadruple-precision floating-point format
 The Double Double, in astronomy, the quadruple star system Epsilon Lyrae
 A doubled set of double yellow lines, used in some parts of the US to indicate a painted median strip and called "double-double yellow lines"
 Double-double, a coffee with two creams and two sugars from Tim Hortons
 Double Double Bonus, a variation of video poker
 The double salto backward tucked with 2/1 turn, a skill in men's and women's artistic gymnastics

Literature and media
 Double, Double (Brunner novel), a 1969 science fiction novel by John Brunner
 Double, Double (Ellery Queen novel), a 1950 mystery novel
 Double, Double (Star Trek novel), a 1989 science fiction novel
 Double Double: A Memoir of Alcoholism by Martha Grimes and Ken Grimes
 "Double, double toil and trouble", a line spoken by the Three Witches in Shakespeare's Macbeth
 Double, Double, Toil and Trouble, a 1993 children's film

See also
 Double bubble (disambiguation)